This is a comparison of firewalls.

Firewall software

Firewall appliances

Firewall rule-set Appliance-UTM filtering features comparison

Notes

Firewall rule-set advanced features comparison

Firewall's other features comparison 

Notes

Non-Firewall extra features comparison 
These are not strictly firewall features, but are sometimes bundled with firewall software or appliance. Features are also marked "yes" if an external module can be installed that meets the criteria.

Notes

See also 
 Internet security
 Comparison of antivirus software
 Next-generation firewall

References 

Firewalls